Krimisa, Crimisa or Crimissa was a small ancient city in Magna Graecia, probably originating in the 7th century BC, situated in Calabria in the region of Punta Alice. It was inhabited by an indigenous people assimilated by the Greeks.

Origin and myth
According to various mythographical accounts, not always uniform and coherent, of Strabo, Pseudo-Apollodorus, Lycophron and Pseudo-Aristotle, the Greek hero Philoctetes reached these places on his way back from the Trojan War, together with the Rhodians under Tlepolemus. He colonized the promontory of Crimisa and founded a city of the same name. Topographically, Krimisa was located in a lower area as compared to Chone, city of the Choni, now Cirò.

Philoctetes was believed to have also founded Petelia (Strongoli) and Macalla. He also had a sanctuary dedicated to Apollo Aleus, where he laid his bow and arrows received as a gift from Heracles. Then, rushing to the aid of his Rhodian allies, he died fighting against barbaric natives. On his tomb erected near the river Sybaris was subsequently built a temple where he was honored with sacrifices.

Historical data
The site dates - from archaeological data collected - to the 7th century BCE. During the Classical period the city was thoroughly Hellenized and remained that way until the Roman era.

Historical area
Even though the identification remains uncertain, scholars are inclined to believe that the city stood in Punta Alice, near the present Cirò Marina.

Archaeological data
The famous Italian archaeologist Paolo Orsi worked in the area where the ancient Krimisa is presumed to have been located, and made several discoveries during excavations carried out between 1924 and 1929. Although scarce, the remains and findings are unequivocally identifiable as those of the sanctuary dedicated to Apollo Aleus. Of the building of the temple (Doric order) are documented:

the first, archaic phase, of which evidence is quite scarce, dating back to the 6th century BCE;
the second phase, represented most notably by items of architectural terracotta, dated from mid-5th century BCE to 4th century BCE.

Archaeological findings
In the Museo Civico Archeologico of Cirò Marina, located in an 18th-century building of Palazzo Porti and in Castello Sabatini, are exhibited several artifacts found in the area of the sanctuary of Apollo Aleus: a capital, several architectural items, a terracotta mask, a pedestal, fragments of a bronze statue, fragments of a wig made of bronze, bronze coins, figurines.

In the Museo Archeologico Nazionale of Crotone there is a section housing the findings from the sanctuary of Apollo Aleus at Cirò Punto Alice: some Doric capitals of the temple, an antefix with a disc portraying a Gorgon from the acroterium, votive tablets, a matrix of an antefix, and fragments of an archaic statuette of a young man in limestone. There is no lack of captions illustrating the site and photos of the famous acrolith.

In the Museo Nazionale della Magna Grecia, more precious items are stored, including:

An artful head, hands and feet of a marble statue of Apollo. The statue in question apparently was an acrolith (i.e. a statue of which only the head and limbs are made of marble, while the body was made of wood or simply a scaffold then covered at all points). The head, which shows the influence of Pheidias, is made of white marble and has holes around the forehead that originally supported a wig made of bronze or a metal crown. It is dated to 440 BC.

Sources
Paolo Orsi, Templum Apollinis Alaei ad Crimisa promontorium, Roma, 1933
Antonino Terminelli, Krimisa, Cirò Marina, 1971
Mario Napoli, Civiltà della Magna Grecia, Roma, 1978
Emanuele Greco, Magna Grecia, Bari, 1980

Former populated places in Italy
Archaeological sites in Calabria